In Italian poetry, verso sciolto (plural versi sciolti) refers to poetry written in hendecasyllables and lacking rhyme. It is very similar to blank verse in English poetry, and the two terms are often used interchangeably.

Music term (Verso) sciolto means Free and Unrestricted (informal) lighthearted in tone.

Psychology: Extremely civil and pleasant. Unthreatening. welcoming. 

Sciolto is an italic literal meaning loosely:

noun:
 a replete freedom or libre
 the ideal of liberty

verb:
 set at liberty, indefinitely, with no conditions, concessions, compromises, terms (of endearment or otherwise).

Musical notation